Sildajazz is a jazz festival, which is held annually on the second weekend of August, in Haugesund, Norway. The inaugural festival was in 1987.

Both domestic and international artists participate at the festival and each year an award Sildjazzprisen is given to a Norwegian jazz musician or band.

The festival is named after the Norwegian word for herring (sild). The reason for this can be found in the rich fishing heritage of past days, and the influence that fishing had on the creation of the city of Haugesund itself.

External links
Sildajazz home page

Jazz festivals in Norway
Haugesund
Culture in Rogaland
Music festivals established in 1987
Annual events in Norway
Summer events in Norway